Geocalyx is a genus of liverworts, the only genus in the family Geocalycaceae of the order Jungermanniales.

The genus has almost cosmopolitan distribution.

Species:
 Geocalyx caledonicus Steph. 
 Geocalyx graveolens (Schrad.) Nees

References

Jungermanniales
Jungermanniales genera